Išḫi-Addu or Ishi-Addu was king of Qatna in the first half of the 18th century BC. He is known for his correspondences with Shamshi-Adad I of Assyria who was his closest ally. Qatna was at its height during Išḫi-Addu's reign, which was, however, plagued with revolts in the southern parts of the kingdom and with constant war with Yamhad, Qatna's northern neighbour.

Reign
Išḫi-Addu is mainly known from his correspondences with Mari for a period of six years between c. 1783–1778 BC. When his reign began is uncertain; he succeeded Amut-piʾel I, who is most probably his father. Qatna was at its apex during the reign of Išḫi-Addu; he was the overlord of Hazor, and the many kingdoms of Amurru which controlled the central Levantine coast between Byblos and Ugarit acknowledged his authority. Išḫi-Addu was a close ally of Shamshi-Adad I of Assyria who conquered Mari and installed his son Yasmah-Adad on its throne. The alliance between Qatna and Assyria was concluded shortly after Yasmah-Adad installation; it was cemented by the c. 1782 BC marriage of Dam-Ḫuraṣi, Išḫi-Addu's daughter, to Yasmah-Adad. The dowry of Qatna's princess was huge and Išhi-Addu demanded his vassals to contribute; a tablet discovered in Hazor contains orders from Qatna for the providing of large quantities of commodities such as textiles, objects made of precious metals and weapons.

Since early in their history, Qatna and Yamhad shared a hostile relation; the situation worsened during Išḫi-Addu's reign and evolved into border warfare. Qatna occupied the city of Parga in the region of Hamath for a while before Sumu-Epuh of Yamhad retook it. In the south, Išḫi-Addu faced a general rebellion; after petitions by Qatna, Shamshi-Adad sent an army to help Išḫi-Addu dealing with the rebellion. Shamshi-Adad planned to send an army of 20,000 soldiers and for his son Yasmah-Adad to lend them leadership, but these plans could not be realized. Instead, a much more modest army was sent under command from generals who were put in the service of Išḫi-Addu in c. 1781 BC. The Assyrian troops avoided engaging Yamhad and did not participate in its war with Qatna while Išḫi-Addu took up residence in Qadeš to oversee the suppression of the rebellion, which apparently was supported by Yamhad. A fortress near lake Qattinah was named after the king "Dur-Išḫi-Addu".

The archive of Mari contains many letters from Išḫi-Addu to Shamshi-Adad and his sons; in one of them, the king of Qatna tried to persuade Yasmah-Adad to join him in conquering three cities, telling his son in law that a big booty awaits them. There was also an incident where Yasmah-Adad detained messengers from Qatna causing Shamshi-Adad to write a sharp letter to his son ordering him to release the messengers. After four years in the service of Qatna, Shamshi-Adad ordered his troops back and it might be connected to a peace treaty between Assyria and Yarim-Lim I, son of Sumu-Epuh; Išḫi-Addu, who in the past declared that "even if Shamshi-Adad would conclude peace with Sumu-epuh, I will never make peace with Sumu-epuh, as long as I live!", was delivered a heavy blow. The sources of Mari are silent on how the king dealt with the situation that resulted from Shamshi-Adad's peace with Yamhad, and by the time they resumed mentioning Qatna in c. 1772 BC, Išḫi-Addu was dead and succeeded by his son Amut-piʾel II.

Personality
Judging by his letters, the king had a great ability to whine whenever he felt insulted; shortly after Shamshi-Adad's death, tension between Išḫi-Addu and the Assyrian king's eldest son Ishme-Dagan I occurred. The king of Assyria asked for two horses from Qatna, and it seems that Išḫi-Addu asked for something in return, but Ishme-Dagan sent a small amount of the horses' real value and seems to not have met Išḫi-Addu's request causing the latter to write an angry message, which was apparently intercepted in Mari by Yasmah-Adad who had interest in keeping his brother and father in law at peace. His letters concerning his daughter also reveal a man capable of compassion; he wrote Yasmah-Adad: "I am placing in your lap my flesh and my future. Your maid i have given you, may god prove her attractive to you. I am placing in your lap my flesh and my future, for this throne ('house') has now become yours and Mari's has now become mine".

Notes

References

Citations

Sources

18th-century BC rulers
Amorite kings
Qatna
18th-century BC people